Jeff Carlson may refer to:

 Jeff Carlson (ice hockey) (born 1953)
 Jeff Carlson (American football) (born 1966)
 Jeff Carlson (author) (born 1969)